Sergei Alexandrovich Demagin (born July 19, 1986) is a Belarusian professional ice hockey forward who is currently an unrestricted free agent. He most recently played with Arlan Kokshetau of the Kazakhstan Hockey Championship.

Playing career
During the 2005–06 season he led the Belarus second-league with 61 points in 39 games. In 2008 he signed a contract with the Hartford Wolf Pack of the American Hockey League but never appeared with the team.

Demagin was selected for the Belarus national men's ice hockey team in the 2010 Winter Olympics. He also participated at the 2010 IIHF World Championship as a member of the Belarus National men's ice hockey team. He previously represented Belarus at the 2006 World Junior Ice Hockey Championships and the 2007 IIHF World Championship.

Career statistics

Regular season and playoffs

International

References

External links

1986 births
Living people
HC Almaty players
Arlan Kokshetau players
Avtomobilist Yekaterinburg players
Belarusian ice hockey left wingers
HC Dinamo Minsk players
Dizel Penza players
HC Lada Togliatti players
HC Neftekhimik Nizhnekamsk players
Ice hockey players at the 2010 Winter Olympics
Olympic ice hockey players of Belarus
Severstal Cherepovets players
Ice hockey people from Minsk
Torpedo Nizhny Novgorod players
HC Yugra players